The Handwoordeboek van die Afrikaanse Taal (HAT),  is the best known explanatory dictionary for the Afrikaans language and is generally regarded as authoritative. Compared to the Woordeboek van die Afrikaanse Taal (WAT) it is a shorter Afrikaans explanatory dictionary in a single volume. The latest edition of the HAT, the sixth, was published in 2015, 50 years after the first edition of 1965. HAT6 comprises 1,636 pages.

History

Understanding the history of the HAT requires an understanding of the relationship between the HAT and the Woordeboek van die Afrikaanse Taal (the WAT), initially known as Die Afrikaanse Woordeboek.

During the 1920s earnest discussions were devoted to the compilation of an Afrikaans dictionary and in March 1926 the erstwhile Nasionale Boekhandel and the government of the day agreed to the publication of a monolingual explanatory dictionary with an extent similar to that of the Dutch Van Dale (a single-volume work) at the time. J.J. Smith, professor of Afrikaans at the University of Stellenbosch, would be the editor, and the aim was to complete the work within three years.

With hindsight the time allocated to this task was completely unrealistic, but it does show with what urgency it was regarded. When the dictionary was not completed in the proposed time, the University of Stellenbosch took over 's part of the contract, setting an (equally unrealistic) target of publishing the dictionary within five years.

After about 20 years Prof. Smith's health failed him. He took leave but did not resume his work on the dictionary. He was succeeded in 1947 as chief editor by Dr. P.C. Schoonees, a school principal from Vryheid.

In the meantime the goal of the WAT had shifted quite drastically. A commission of inquiry recommended that a board of control be established. This placed the WAT undertaking on firmer footing. The secretary of education would serve as chairperson and the rector of the University of Stellenbosch as administrator. Hereafter the goal was no longer to compile a desk dictionary, but a comprehensive work that would record and explain the “complete” Afrikaans vocabulary, such as the Oxford English Dictionary (OED) for English and the Woordenboek der Nederlandsche Taal (WNT) for Dutch.

Such a work could certainly not be completed in five years’ time.

Under Schoonees's guidance the first part of the dictionary (A—C) was published in 1951, the second part (D—F) in 1955 and the third part (G) in 1957. It was now clear that dictionary could progress, but at the same it was equally clear that in spite of a sizeable expansion of the editorial team it would prove impossible to complete such a comprehensive work within a couple of years.

First edition (1965) 

Consequently, towards the end of the 1950s and beginning of the 1960s, the board of control decided that compilation of a “standard” or “desk” dictionary should commence alongside the work on the comprehensive dictionary. Adverts were placed for the post of editor, but although many applications were received, the board made no appointment.

The discussions, however, did have a positive result: Schoonees accepted the challenge to compile an Afrikaans desk dictionary in his own time. The board of control approved his undertaking; moreover, it gave him permission to use the WAT’s material for his task.

Thus a close connection was established between the WAT and the first edition of the HAT, a bond that would be broken only after Schoonees died.

In spite of Schoonees's enthusiasm and perseverance it soon became apparent that for one person to compile a desk dictionary from scratch in a relatively short time was a very difficult if not impossible task. With the help of C.J. Swanepoel, a co-editor of the WAT, the work accelerated somewhat, but according to Schoonees still not quickly enough. Dr. S.J. du Toit, another co-editor of the WAT, was seconded too, and later the Afrikaans teacher, C. Murray Booysen, joined the team as well. The first edition of the Verklarende Handwoordeboek van die Afrikaanse Taal was published in 1965 under all four names, though by then Booysen had retired for health reasons. Although Schoonees was the de facto chief editor, he was not named as such.

HAT1 was published by Voortrekkerpers, which would some years later merge with the Afrikaanse Pers Boekhandel to form Perskor. HAT2 and HAT3 were published by Perskor. HAT4 (still with the Perskor imprint) and HAT5 were published by Pearson Education South Africa, a division of Maskew Miller Longman, into which Perskor was incorporated in the late 1990s.

Second edition (1979) 

In 1971 Perskor offered Francois F. Odendal, professor in Afrikaans and Dutch linguistics at the then Rand Afrikaans University and chairperson of the language commission of the South African Academy for Science and Arts, the editorship of the HAT. At this point Odendal had published several papers on the lexicography. He had worked at the state terminology bureau for three years and had served as co-editor and assistant chief editor of the WAT for ten years. His lengthy association (since 1962) with the language commission had kept him in touch with the practice of wordsmithing.

Odendal accepted Perskor's offer and asked the publisher what it considered a realistic time for the completion of the work. The answer was two years. Odendal set the target at four years. Eventually the thorough revision would consume eight years.

In 1972 Odendal assumed full responsibility for HAT2. Thus a new chapter in the history of the HAT began, with Odendal as the sole editor for almost 25 years.

For the second edition he expanded the dictionary by about 50%, this constituting a truly revised edition. Besides additions, definitions were altered and archaic words and meanings deleted, especially words and meanings that were more Dutch than Afrikaans. (Here the contribution of Mrs Estelle Odendal should be mentioned, who recorded new and missing words from newspapers, magazines and books the whole time her husband was working on the HAT.)

An aspect to which Odendal gave special attention while working on HAT2 was the expansion and improvement of example phrases, since words “in action” in well-chosen example phrases, in syntactical context therefore, reveal their meaning better than definitions on their own do.

HAT2 was published in 1979 by Perskor under Odendal's name, with the names of the original four editors (even though their contribution had ceased). The dictionary had a favourable reception, prompting Odendal to continue with the work with a third edition in mind.

Third edition (1993) 

It soon became apparent that the HAT had captured its particular niche in the market and was accepted as authoritative by the Afrikaans public. The dictionary was to be found in most homes, schools and universities, as well as in government offices and businesses. Particularly important was that in the determination of the meaning of a word in higher and lower courts, the HAT was accepted as the authority. Also that newspapers and the writers of letters to the press, where the meaning of a word was concerned, regularly quoted the HAT as an authoritative reference.

The HAT had become a household name.

When Perskor began talking about a third edition with intent, Odendal started to work on the dictionary full-time. He left the service of RAU in 1989, two years before his compulsory retirement date, to complete the revision.

HAT3 was published in 1993 and was received exceptionally well by the media, even better than HAT2. In the late 1990s HAT3 was also released in an electronic format – the first Afrikaans dictionary on CD-ROM, called el-HAT.

In preparing HAT3 Odendal tried to improve all facets of HAT2. The extent of the dictionary was increased by 30% (made possible by setting the text in three columns instead of two). More archaic words were carefully removed and labels in particular were systematically revised (which meant that a word without a label could be assumed to be standard Afrikaans).

Labelling racist words proved quite a challenge, and to a lesser extent gender words. There was considerable pressure to delete such words in their entirety so as not to offend any user of Afrikaans. However, Odendal's standpoint was that for a complete view on the Afrikaans vocabulary some of these words had to be included. This category of words was treated with much more circumspection and empathy than in the past. With the correct labels (as well as with the wording of the definitions) every effort was made to give sufficient indication of the status of these words.

The value Odendal attached to example phrases has been mentioned. In HAT3 he increased the number of self-made examples, and supplemented them with a large number of citations from the work of Afrikaans writers. Hereby the high standard of the Afrikaans literature was acknowledged, as well as its contribution to the development of Afrikaans. As in the previous editions particular attention was given to fixed expressions and idioms, elucidated and grouped in a set fashion at the end of a lemma.

HAT3 was the first Afrikaans dictionary in which the compiler tried to give a proper explanation of the modus operandi and the theoretical principles on which a dictionary is based. Still lacking was a schematic representation of the various components of a lemma, something which could be of great help to the user. This was rectified in HAT4 and even more so in HAT5.

Fourth edition (2000) 

To ensure that the HAT stayed in capable hands when he could no longer participate, Odendal proposed to Perskor in the 1990s that it was time to appoint a second, younger editor. His pre-eminent status as theoretical and practical lexicographer made Rufus H. Gouws, professor in Afrikaans linguistics at the University of Stellenbosch, an excellent choice.

Both Perskor and Gouws accepted the proposal.

In the planning of HAT4 Gouws and Odendal decided that the allocated time precluded an incisive revision of HAT3. For a general revision the dictionary was divided between the editors into two equal parts. Odendal would take the first half, Gouws the second. However, one editor would be responsible for a particular aspect from A to Z, such as adding citations, refining the labels, and supplementing and checking computer terms. In spite of the limited time archaisms were deleted and many new words added. An innovation was the (circumspect) inclusion of a number of English words, which garnered some criticism, but also support. A diagram illustrating the various components of a lemma was included in the front matter of the book.

HAT4 was published in 2000 by Pearson Education South Africa, a division of Maskew Miller Longman, into which Perskor was incorporated. (The name Perskor was retained as imprint for the fourth edition.)

Fifth edition (2005) 

 
In 2003 Pearson asked the compilers to deliver a fifth edition in 2004. Both editors reacted negatively: there was too little time. As a more realistic target Gouws suggested 2005, which would also allow its publication to coincide with the fortieth anniversary of the first publication of the HAT in 1965.

For HAT5 the two editors again took responsibility for one half of the dictionary, Gouws the first half, Odendal the second (the reverse of HAT4). As with HAT4 each editor assumed special responsibility for particular aspects of the dictionary as a whole: expanding the etymologies, improving the lemma layout, expanding the abbreviations and moving them to a special section at the back of the book, adding a section of geographical names with their derivatives, refining the labels further, sourcing additional suitable citations, and compiling a complete usage guide for the front matter. In addition more “foreign” yet common words were included and, with circumspection, words from varieties other than standard Afrikaans.

HAT5 is the first edition of which the lemma selection was based on a representative, comprehensive and balanced electronic corpus.

Odendal would have retired from the editorial team after the completion of the fourth edition of the HAT, but for various reasons stayed on till HAT5 was completed. At the launch of HAT5, on 14 September 2005 at the Spier Estate outside Stellenbosch, he was honoured for his more than 30 years of commitment and dedication to the Handwoordeboek van die Afrikaanse Taal and bid farewell.

e-HAT 2009 

In October 2007 Pearson Education appointed Jana Luther, inter alia former senior editor of the Pharos Afrikaans-English-English-Afrikaans Dictionary (2005) and co-editor of the Pharos Afrikaans-English-English-Afrikaans Concise Dictionary (2007), as dictionary compiler and publisher. In 2008 she joined Gouws as editor for the preparation of HAT6.

A CD-ROM – e-HAT 2009 – was launched with the third impression of HAT5 in March 2009. This electronic dictionary contains the complete alphabetical list, list of abbreviations and list of geographical names and their derivatives of the fifth edition of the Verklarende Handwoordeboek van die Afrikaanse Taal. The third edition received a new cover and the title was truncated to Handwoordeboek van die Afrikaanse Taal). Typographical and spelling errors that were brought to the editors’ attention since the publication of the fifth edition in 2005 were corrected in the electronic dictionary and, in accordance with the Afrikaanse woordelys en spelreëls of the Afrikaans language commission of the SA Academy, certain improvements were applied.

e-HAT 2009 is the first step on the road to a new, improved and comprehensively revised sixth edition of the HAT that is intended to mirror contemporary Afrikaans. The work on this new edition has been ongoing at Pearson South Africa since 2008 and was nearing completion at the beginning of 2015. To assist in the preparation of HAT6, Pearson in 2012 appointed Fred Pheiffer, a former colleague of Luther and likewise co-editor of the abovementioned two Pharos dictionaries. In addition he worked as compiler, co-editor and project manager on the Oxford Bilingual School Dictionary: isiZulu and English (2010), the Oxford South African School Dictionary (2010), the Oxford Afrikaanse Skoolwoordeboek (2012) and the Oxford Bilingual School Dictionary: isiXhosa and English (2014).

References

External links
 Pearson Dictionaries SA
 Pearson Education South Africa

Afrikaans
Afrikaans dictionaries
Dutch dictionaries
Lexicography